Marko Tejić (born 4 August 1995) is a Serbian professional basketball player for Zlatibor of the Basketball League of Serbia and the Second ABA League.

Professional career
Tejić grew up with the Crvena zvezda youth team and signed a first professional contract with his club during 2013. In April 2016, he was loaned to FMP for the rest of the season. On July 21, 2016, Tejić was loaned to Mega Leks.

On September 26, 2017, Tejić joined Aries Trikala of the Greek Basket League. On July 5, 2018, he joined AZS Koszalin of the PKL.

In August 2019, Tejić signed a two-year contract for FMP. On 20 October 2020, he signed for the Montenegrin team Studentski centar.

On September 30, 2021, Tejić signed with Rytas Vilnius of the Lithuanian Basketball League. He parted ways with Rytas Vilnius in November 2021. In January 2022, he signed with Spars Sarajevo. In August 2022, he signed for Zlatibor.

Career statistics

Euroleague

|-
| style="text-align=left;"| 2013–14
| style="text-align-left;" rowspan="3"| Crvena zvezda
| 1 || 1 || 14.8 || .667 || .000 || .000 || 2.0 || 1.0 || .0 || .0 || 4.0 || 2.0
|-
| style="text-align=left;"| 2014–15
| 17 || 4 || 8.9 || .357 || .333 || .375 || 1.4 || .7 || .1 || .1 || 1.6 || .1
|-
| style="text-align=left;"| 2015–16
| 11 || 3 || 5.7 || .200 || .000 || .333 || 1.1 || .5 || .2 || .1 || .7 || .0
|- class="sortbottom"
| style="text-align=center;" colspan="2"| Career
| 29 || 8 || 7.9 || .326 || .222 || .357 || 1.3 || .7 || .1 || .1 || 1.3 || .1

References

External links

 Marko Tejić at aba-liga.com
 Marko Tejić at euroleague.net

1995 births
Living people
ABA League players
Aries Trikala B.C. players
AZS Koszalin players
Basketball League of Serbia players
Centers (basketball)
BC Rytas players
KK Crvena zvezda players
KK FMP players
KK Mega Basket players
KK Studentski centar players
OKK Spars players
KK Zlatibor players
Power forwards (basketball)
Serbian expatriate basketball people in Bosnia and Herzegovina
Serbian expatriate basketball people in Greece
Serbian expatriate basketball people in Lithuania
Serbian expatriate basketball people in Montenegro
Serbian expatriate basketball people in Poland
Serbian men's basketball players
Sportspeople from Užice